Souilly is a commune in the Meuse department in Grand Est in north-eastern France.

The Town Hall, fronting on the Voie Sacrée, served as headquarters for general Pétain and, later, general Nivelle during the Battle of Verdun in 1916. In 1918, it served as headquarters for general Pershing during the Meuse-Argonne Offensive.

References

Communes of Meuse (department)
Duchy of Bar